Prince Christian of Hanover (Christian Heinrich Clemens Paul Frank Peter Welf Wilhelm-Ernst Friedrich Franz; born 1 June 1985) is a German noble, the younger son of Ernst August, Prince of Hanover, and his first wife, Chantal Hochuli.

Early life and education 
Hanover was born Christian Heinrich Clemens Paul Frank Peter Welf Wilhelm Ernst Friedrich Franz on 1 June 1985 in Hildesheim, Lower Saxony, West Germany. His parents Ernst August, Prince of Hanover, and Chantal Hochuli, an heiress to a Swiss chocolate company, divorced on 23 October 1997. Less than two years later, on 23 January 1999, his father married Princess Caroline of Monaco.

Marriage

On 24 November 2017, Christian married Peruvian lawyer Alessandra de Osma in a civil service at the Chelsea and Westminster register office in London. The couple celebrated their religious wedding on 16 March 2018 at Basilica of San Pedro, in Lima, with the Rev. Hans-Jürgen Hoeppke (IELP-Evangelical Lutheran Church of Peru; Christuskirche in Lima) and Bishop Norbert Klemens Strotmann of the diocese of Chosica officiating. After moving permanently to Madrid, the couple announced in March 2020 they were expecting a set of twins, and Alessandra gave birth on 7 July 2020 at Quirón Clinic in Pozuelo de Alarcón. The couple live in the neighbourhood of Puerta de Hierro, near the eponymous club.

Titles and styles 
After the German Revolution of 1918–1919 and the establishment of the Weimar Republic in 1919, legal recognition of hereditary titles was abolished. Since the introduction of the Weimar Constitution, the use of titles in Germany has been unofficial, while legally they are retained only as surnames.

Christian's name in Germany thus is Christian Heinrich Clemens Paul Frank Peter Welf Wilhelm-Ernst Friedrich Franz Prinz von Hannover Herzog zu Braunschweig und Lüneburg Königlicher Prinz von Großbritannien und Irland, where Prinz von Hannover Herzog zu Braunschweig und Lüneburg Königlicher Prinz von Großbritannien und Irland is his last name, not his title.

References

External links 
 Official Website of the House of Welf

1985 births
German people of Swiss descent
Hanoverian princes
Living people
People from Hildesheim